Clive Rose may refer to:

Clive Rose (cricketer) (born 1989), Australian cricketer
Clive Rose (diplomat) (1921–2019), British diplomat